Diaz – Don't Clean Up This Blood, or only Diaz, is a 2012 Italian-French-Romanian drama film directed by Daniele Vicari, focusing on the final days of the 2001 G8 summit in Genoa, Italy, when police stormed Armando Diaz, a school in Genoa. In the nighttime raid, over 300 police officers attacked activists and journalists, seriously injuring 61 and putting one in a coma.

Plot 
The film focuses on the storming of the Diaz school in Genoa by the police after the 2001 G8 summit. In that building were protesters against the international summit on the night between 21 and 22 July 2001.
It is based on the testimonies and reports from judicial processes.

The film develops through the intertwining stories of some of the protagonists. Luca is a reporter for the Journal of Bologna. He decides to go and verify what's happening in Genoa, after the death of Carlo Giuliani. Alma is a German anarchist who participated in the fighting. Alma, Marco (a member of the Social Forum) and Franci (a lawyer for the Genoa Legal Forum) provide for the search for the missing.
Anselmo is a senior activist in the Pensioners' Union. He participated in a peaceful march against the G8. Etienne and Cecile are two French anarchists: they have been directly involved in the clashes of those days. Finally Max, first assistant chief of police mobile squad of Rome: in the morning on 21 July 2001, he decided not to order a charge against the Black Block, to avoid the involvement of so many peaceful demonstrators. The destinies of all of them and hundreds of other protesters crossed the night of July 21, 2001, in the Diaz school.

Cast
Many of the characters are based (in some cases maintaining the initials) to people actually inside of Diaz on the day of the blitz: the cop played by Claudio Santamaria (Max Flamini) is Michelangelo Fournier, head of the VII nucleus of the experimental mobile squad of Rome. The journalist played by Elio Germano (Luke Gualtieri, the fictional Journal of Bologna) is Lorenzo Guadagnucci, journalist of Il Resto del Carlino. UK Indymedia journalist being beaten on the street in front of Diaz is Mark Covell, who had a punctured lung and went into a coma.

 Elio Germano: Luca Gualtieri, journalist
 Claudio Santamaria: Max Flamini
 Jennifer Ulrich: Alma Koch, German anarchist
 Davide Iacopini: Marco, organizer of Genoa Social Forum
 Sarah Marecek: Inga
 Monica Elena Birladeanu: Constantine Giornal
 Ralph Amoussou: Etienne
 Pietro Ragusa: Aaron	
 Pippo Delbono:
 Rolando Ravello: Rodolfo Serpieri
 Alessandro Roja: Marco Cerone
 Antonio Gerardi: Achille Faleri
 Aylin Prandi: Maria
 Jacopo Maria Bicocchi: Silvio Pieri
 Mircea Caraman: Vittorio Donati
 Ioana Picos: Gilda
 Micaela Bara: Karin
 James Longshore: Charles
 Razvan Hincu: Amico John
 Fabrizio Rongione: Nick Janssen
 Paolo Calabresi: Francesco Scaron
 Renato Scarpa: Anselmo Vitali

Reception 
The film was presented at the 2012 Berlinale in the section Panorama and received the Panorama second audience award. Reviewing the film for Bring The Noise UK, Michael Dodd called it "one of the most compelling and uncompromising films of recent memory". Giving the movie a rare ten out of ten rating, he concluded by stating that "this is a film that simply has to be watched".

References

External links 
 

2012 films
2012 drama films
French drama films
Romanian drama films
Italian drama films
2010s Italian-language films
Films set in Genoa
Drama films based on actual events
Films directed by Daniele Vicari
Films set in 2001
2010s French films
Fandango (Italian company) films